Synploca is a genus of moth in the family Cosmopterigidae. It contains only one species, Synploca gumia, which is found in North America, where it has been recorded from Arizona and Texas.

References

External links
Natural History Museum Lepidoptera genus database

Cosmopteriginae